Bradco Supply was a distributor of building materials for the commercial and residential building markets, particularly roofing supplies.

Company history
Bradco Supply was founded in 1966 by Barry Segal, with a single warehouse in Avenel, New Jersey.

In 2007, Apollo Management acquired a minority interest in Bradco Supply. The following year, Advent International acquired a majority ownership in Bradco Supply. Also in 2008, founder Barry Segal retired.

In 2010, Bradco was acquired by ABC Supply. In 2013, ABC repurchased all outstanding shares from minority stakeholders, including the stakes the investors had in Bradco.

References

Distribution companies of the United States
Business services companies established in 1966
2010 disestablishments in New Jersey
Building materials companies of the United States
Private equity portfolio companies
Apollo Global Management companies
1966 establishments in New Jersey
2008 mergers and acquisitions
2010 mergers and acquisitions